Bakir Beširević (born 3 November 1965) is a retired Bosnian professional football midfielder who played for Velež Mostar and Orašje in Bosnia and Herzegovina and Osijek in the Croatian Prva HNL.

Club career
Beširević is Osijek's second most capped player behind Mile Škorić.

International career
He made his debut for Bosnia and Herzegovina in an October 1996 FIFA World Cup qualification match against Croatia in Bologna and has earned a total of 19 caps, scoring no goals. His final international was a January 2000 friendly match against Qatar.

References

External links

1965 births
Living people
Footballers from Sarajevo
Association football midfielders
Yugoslav footballers
Bosnia and Herzegovina footballers
Bosnia and Herzegovina international footballers
FK Velež Mostar players
NK Osijek players
NK Pazinka players
HNK Orašje players
Yugoslav First League players
Croatian Football League players
Premier League of Bosnia and Herzegovina players
Bosnia and Herzegovina expatriate footballers
Expatriate footballers in Croatia
Bosnia and Herzegovina expatriate sportspeople in Croatia